Richard Aherne (born Vincent Richard Ahern; 19 March 1911 – 8 June 2002) was an Irish actor. He is sometimes credited as Richard Nugent.

He was born in Dublin, Ireland, the son of William Ahern and Mary Brophy Ahern of Ross, County Meath. He died in Los Angeles, California, United States, aged 91.

Selected filmography
 The Purple V (1943) – British Radio Operator in Africa (uncredited)
 Sahara (1943) – Capt. Jason Halliday
 The Story of Dr. Wassell (1944) – British Convoy Commander (uncredited) (unbilled)
 The Pearl of Death (1944) – Bates
 The Master Race (1944) – Sergeant O'Farrell 
 Of Human Bondage (1946) – Emil Miller 
 My Hands Are Clay (1948) – Sean Regan
 Christopher Columbus (1949) – Vicente Yañez Pinzon
 D-Day the Sixth of June (1956) – Grainger, Associated Press Correspondent (uncredited)
 Pardners (1956) – Chauffeur
 Around the World in Eighty Days (1956) – Minor Role (uncredited)
 The Buster Keaton Story (1957) – Franklin
 Death Wish 4: The Crackdown (1987) – The Real Nathan White (final film role)

References

External links

1911 births
2002 deaths
Male actors from Dublin (city)
Irish male film actors
Irish male television actors
20th-century Irish male actors
Irish expatriate male actors in the United States